National Tertiary Route 757, or just Route 757 (or ) is a National Road Route of Costa Rica, located in the Alajuela province.

Description
In Alajuela province the route covers Orotina canton (Orotina, El Mastate, Coyolar districts).

References

Highways in Costa Rica